The 1987 Federation Professional League season started on 4 April and ended on 25 November 1987. It was won by Lightbody's Santos.

References 

Federation Professional League
1987 in South African sport